Darbar may refer to:
 Darbar-e Azam, a council of ministers implemented in 1872 in Qajar Iran constituting a cabinet
 Durbar (court), a term for a court in Urdu from the Persian
 Darbar (Raga), a musical scale/mode of South Indian classical music (Carnatic music)
 Darbar Sahib (disambiguation)
 Darbar (title) or Darbar Saheb  is a title of honor used in India
 Darbar, Iran (disambiguation), places in Iran
 Darbar (film), a 2020 Indian Tamil-language action film